Atrichops is a genus of flies in the family Athericidae.

Species
Atrichops apollinis Lindner, 1923
Atrichops basiflava Yang, Dong & Zhang, 2016
Atrichops chakratongi Nagatomi, 1979
Atrichops chotei Nagatomi, 1979
Atrichops crassipes (Meigen, 1820)
Atrichops fontinalis (Nagatomi, 1958)
Atrichops fulvithorax Nagatomi, 1984
Atrichops hesperius Cockerell, 1914
Atrichops morimotoi (Nagatomi, 1953)
Atrichops numidicus Thomas & Gagnéur, 1982
Atrichops singularis Yang, Dong & Zhang, 2016
Atrichops stuckenbergi Nagatomi, 1984
Atrichops zhangae Yang, Dong & Zhang, 2016

References

Athericidae
Brachycera genera
Taxa named by George Henry Verrall
Diptera of Africa
Diptera of Asia
Diptera of Europe